Lamtoglyphus is a genus of mites in the family Acaridae.

Species
 Lamtoglyphus coineaui Fain, 1975

References

Acaridae